The Unified National Leadership of the Uprising (UNLU) (al-Qiyada al Muwhhada) is a coalition of the Local Palestinian leadership. During the First Intifada it played an important role in mobilizing grassroots support for the uprising. In 1987 The Intifada caught the Palestine Liberation Organisation (PLO) by surprise, the leadership abroad could only indirectly influence the events. A new local leadership emerged, the Unified National Leadership of the Uprising (UNLU), comprising many leading Palestinian factions. The disturbances, initially spontaneous, soon came under local leadership from groups and organizations loyal to the PLO that operated within the West Bank and Gaza Strip; Fatah, the Popular Front, the Democratic Front and the Palestine Communist Party. The UNLU was the focus of the social cohesion that sustained the persistent disturbances. After King Hussein of Jordan proclaimed the administrative and legal separation of the West Bank from Jordan in 1988, the UNLU organised to fill the political vacuum.

Birth
Sari Nusseibeh recorded the birth of the UNLU in a 1989 article:

For two weeks the fire [of the revolt] in almost unfathomable proportions. Even the local grassroots committees, activists and leaders were caught off guard. ... The first underground leaflets of the intifada made a shy appearance. ... The Communiqués No. 2 of the Intifada appeared. Rumours have it that it was at this stage, through consultations with, and with the aid and blessing of Abu Jihad [Fatah second in command Khalil Wazir], that the Unified Command was conceived and created. ... Communiqués No. 3 enshrining the birth of the Unified Command appeared. The uprising leaflets suddenly took on a special format, which continues to exist till this day."

Organisation
The PLO's rivals in this activity were the Islamic organizations, Hamas and Islamic Jihad. The PLO viewed other organisations as a threat to its premier political position as well as local leadership in cities such as Beit Sahour and Bethlehem. However, the uprising was predominantly led by community councils led by Hanan Ashrawi, Faisal Husseini and Haidar Abdel-Shafi, that promoted independent networks for education (underground schools as the regular schools were closed by the military as reprisals for the uprising), medical care, and food aid. The UNLU gained credibility where the Palestinian society complied with the issued communiqués.

PLO leaders in Tunisia issued Communiqués for the UNLU, through al-Quds Palestinian Arab Radio operating with Syrian aid.

Activities
The UNLU and Ghassan Andoni in Beit Sahour, urged people to stop paying taxes to Israel, which inherited and modified the previous Jordanian tax-collection regime in the West Bank. "No taxation without representation," said a statement from the organizers. "The military authorities do not represent us, and we did not invite them to come to our land. Must we pay for the bullets that kill our children or for the expenses of the occupying army?" The people of Beit Sahour responded to this call with an organized citywide tax strike that included refusal to pay and file tax returns.

Israeli defence minister Yitzhak Rabin responded: "We will teach them there is a price for refusing the laws of Israel."

Unlike Hamas, the UNLU have rejected a hijab policy for women. They have also targeted those who seek to impose the hijab.

New Guard

In the first few months of the uprising meetings of Popular committee were legal but as the UNLU leaders were subjected to arrests the movement went underground. The older prominent personalities that had previously dominated Palestinian politics were supplanted by new more youthful politicians rising from the cadres of the UNLU.

Footnotes

Bibliography
Zachary Lockman, Joel Beinin (1989) Intifada: The Palestinian Uprising Against Israeli Occupation South End Press, 
Joel Beinin, Joe Stork, Middle East Report (1997) Political Islam: essays from Middle East Report I.B.Tauris, 
Suha Sabbagh (1998) Palestinian women of Gaza and the West Bank Indiana University Press, 
Robert Freedman (1991) The Intifada: Its Impact on Israel, the Arab World, and the Superpowers University Press of Florida, 
Gilles Kepel, Anthony F. Roberts (2006) Jihad: the trail of political Islam Translated by Anthony F. Roberts I.B.Tauris, 
Glenn E. Robinson (1997) Building a Palestinian state: the incomplete revolution Indiana University Press,  
Akhil Gupta, James Ferguson (1997) Culture, power, place: explorations in critical anthropology Duke University Press, 
(1994) Speaking stones : communiqués from the Intifada underground. Compiled, edited, and translated by Shaul Mishal and Reuben Aharoni Syracuse University Press, 

1987 establishments in the Palestinian territories
Defunct political party alliances in the Palestinian territories
Palestine Liberation Organization